The 1986 FIBA World Championship for Women (Russian:1986 Чемпионат мира ФИБА среди женщин) was hosted by the Soviet Union from August 8–17, 1986. The USA won the tournament, defeating the Soviet Union 108-88 in the final.

Venues
Olympic Stadium (Moscow)
Minsk Sports Palace (Minsk)
 (Vilnius)

Squads

Preliminary round

Group A

Group B

Final four

Bronze medal game

Final

Final standings

Awards

References

External links
 1986 FIBA World Championship for Women

FIBA Women's Basketball World Cup
International basketball competitions hosted by the Soviet Union
FIBA
FIBA
Sports competitions in Minsk
Sports competitions in Moscow
Sports competitions in Vilnius
August 1986 sports events in Europe
Women's basketball in the Soviet Union
1986 in Moscow
1980s in Minsk
20th century in Vilnius